Hoplisoides nebulosus is a species of sand wasp in the family Crabronidae. It is found in North America.

Subspecies
These two subspecies belong to the species Hoplisoides nebulosus:
 Hoplisoides nebulosus nebulosus (Packard, 1867)
 Hoplisoides nebulosus spilopterus (Handlirsch, 1888)

References

Crabronidae
Articles created by Qbugbot
Insects described in 1867